SDLC may refer to:

 Systems development life cycle or system design life cycle, which is often used in the process of software development
 Synchronous Data Link Control, an IBM communications protocol